Hokitika is a former parliamentary electorate in the West Coast region of New Zealand, based on the town of Hokitika. It existed from 1871 to 1890 and was represented by nine members of parliament. For a time, it was one of the two-member electorates in New Zealand.

History
The Hokitika electorate existed from the 1871 general election to 1890. John White was its first representative until the end of the parliamentary term in 1875, when he retired.

Beginning with the 1875–1876 general election, which was held in Hokitika on 14 January 1876, the electorate was represented by two members. Edmund Barff and Charles Button were elected, Robert Reid and Richard Seddon (the later Premier) were defeated, and Conrad Hoos withdrew just before the election. Barff served the whole term until 1879, while Button resigned in May 1878 and was succeeded by Seymour Thorne George in an 1878 by-election, and who a year later successfully stood in the Rodney electorate.

Robert Reid and Richard Seddon were elected in the 1879 general election. Seddon, who was later Premier ("King Dick"), was in 1881 elected for Kumara. Reid contested the 1881 general election against Gerard George Fitzgerald, with the latter being successful.

John Bevan won the 1884 general election, and he was succeeded in the 1887 election by Joseph Grimmond. In 1890, the Hokitika electorate was abolished. Grimmond stood in the Westland electorate instead, but was defeated by Richard Seddon.

Members of parliament
Hokitika was represented by nine members of parliament.

1871 to 1875
From 1871 to 1875, Hokitika was a single-member electorate. It was represented by one Member of Parliament.

1876 to 1881
From 1876 to 1881, Hokitika was a two-member electorate. It was represented by five Members of Parliament.

1881 to 1890
From 1881 to 1890, Hokitika was again a single-member electorate, represented by three Members of Parliament.

Election results

1887 election

1884 election

1881 election

1879 election

1878 by-election

1876 election

Table footnotes

Notes

References

Politics of the West Coast, New Zealand
Hokitika
1870 establishments in New Zealand
1890 disestablishments in New Zealand